The Amazons is a 1917 American silent comedy film directed by Joseph Kaufman and starred Marguerite Clark, Elsie Lawson, and Helen Greene. The film was based on the 1883 play of the same name by Sir Arthur Wing Pinero, and adapted for the screen by Frances Marion. It was produced and distributed by Famous Players-Lasky and distributed by Paramount Pictures under the Famous Players-Lasky name. The film is now presumed lost.

Plot
As described in a film magazine review, because the parents are disappointed that their three children are girls instead of boys, they are brought up as boys by the Marchioness of Castlejordan (Robinson), and no males are allowed within the walls of the estate. The antics of the three upset the villagers and cause gossip. Tommy (Clark), the youngest, is sent to London to visit relatives. She slips away from the house dressed in a gentleman's evening clothes and visits a dance hall. Encountering a bully, in self-defense she knocks him down. Escaping from the hall, she jumps into the cab of Lord Litterly (Hinckley), who takes her home, and a warm friendship springs up between them. Later, the lord is instrumental in saving her from a fall from a runaway horse. Her two sisters arrange a meeting with two men in the gymnasium one evening. Tommy climbs through a skylight and "drops in" on Litterly, who happened to be bringing a message with a maid. The Marchioness discovers the trio, and seeing that her girls will be girls, gives them her blessing, and a triple wedding follows.

Cast
Marguerite Clark as Lord Tommy
Elsie Lawson as Willie (*aka Eleanor Lawson)
Helen Greene as Noel
William Hinckley as Lord Litterly
Helen Robinson as Marchioness of Castlejordan
Edgar Norton as Lord Tweenways
Andre Bellon as Count de Grival
Roxanne Lancing as Sgt. Shuter
Jack Standing as unconfirmed role

References

External links

allmovie/synopsis; The Amazons

1917 films
1917 comedy films
Silent American comedy films
American silent feature films
American black-and-white films
Famous Players-Lasky films
American films based on plays
Lost American films
Paramount Pictures films
Films directed by Joseph Kaufman
1917 lost films
Lost comedy films
1910s American films
1910s English-language films
English-language comedy films